Alexander Soutar Milne (born 4 June 1937) is a Scottish former professional footballer.

Career

Born in Dundee, Milne began his career at Arbroath before moving to Cardiff City in 1957. By the end of his first season at the club he had established himself in the side. He was a vital part of the Cardiff squad at the time, being ever present in the 1958–59 and 1961–62 seasons, scoring his only league goal in a 3–2 defeat to Wolverhampton Wanderers in the latter.

He had injury problems in 1964/65 and drifted out of contention for a place in the Cardiff team.

He was allowed to leave the club soon after and finished his career at Barry Town before emigrating to Canada in 1965 to play in the Eastern Canada Professional Soccer League with Toronto Inter-Roma.

References

Sources
 

1937 births
Living people
Footballers from Dundee
Scottish footballers
Arbroath F.C. players
Cardiff City F.C. players
Barry Town United F.C. players
Toronto Roma players
English Football League players
Scottish Football League players
Eastern Canada Professional Soccer League players
Association football defenders
Dundee Violet F.C. players
Scotland under-23 international footballers